= Pseudamphilochus =

Scientific classification
- Kingdom: Animalia
- Phylum: Arthropoda
- Class: Malacostraca
- Order: Amphipoda
- Family: Pseudamphilochidae
- Genus: Pseudamphilochus; Schellenberg, 1931
- Species: P. shoemakeri

Binomial name
- Pseudamphilochus shoemakeri Schellenberg, 1931

Genus of crustaceans

Pseudamphilochus is a monotypic genus of crustaceans belonging to the monotypic family Pseudamphilochidae. The only species is Pseudamphilochus shoemakeri.

The species is found in Antarctica.
